Giorgi Kantaria (born on 27 April 1997) is a Georgian professional footballer who plays as a defender for Azerbaijan Premier League team Kapaz.

References

External links

 FC Neman Official Site Profile 

1997 births
Living people
Association football defenders
Footballers from Georgia (country)
Expatriate footballers from Georgia (country)
Expatriate footballers in Belarus
Expatriate footballers in Azerbaijan
FC Dinamo Tbilisi players
FC Zugdidi players
FC Neman Grodno players
FC Telavi players
Kapaz PFK players